The 1891 Iowa gubernatorial election was held on November 3, 1891. Incumbent Democrat Horace Boies defeated Republican nominee Herman C. Wheeler with 49.40% of the vote.

General election

Candidates
Major party candidates
Horace Boies, Democratic 
Herman C. Wheeler, Republican

Other candidates
A. J. Westfall, People's
Isaac T. Gibson, Prohibition

Results

References

1891
Iowa